The mixed 4 × 50 freestyle relay - 20 points swimming events for the 2016 Summer Paralympics took place at the Rio Olympic Stadium on 9 September 2016.

Competition format
Each event consists of two rounds: heats and final. The top eight teams overall in the heats progressed to the final. 
Relay teams consist of two men and two women, and are based on a point score. The sport class of an individual swimmer is worth the actual number value i.e. sport class S6 is worth six points, sport class SB12 is worth twelve points, and so on. The total of all the  competitors must add up to 20 points or less.

Records
Prior to the competition, the World record was as follows:

Heats

Heat 1
11:34 9 September 2016

Heat 2
11:41 9 September 2016

Source:

Final
20:43 9 September 2016

Source:

External links

Notes

Swimming at the 2016 Summer Paralympics